The Thunder Bay Art Gallery is Northern Ontario's largest art gallery specializing in the work of contemporary Indigenous artists. It is located on the campus of Confederation College in Thunder Bay, Ontario, Canada. The Thunder Bay Art Gallery is the largest public gallery between Sault Ste. Marie and Winnipeg, featuring over 4,000 sq/ft of exhibition space.

As a non-profit, public art gallery, the Thunder Bay Art Gallery exhibits, collects, and interprets art with a particular focus on the contemporary artwork of Indigenous and Northwestern Ontario artists. The Gallery advances the relationship between artists, their art, and the public, nurturing a life-long appreciation of contemporary visual arts among visitors to Thunder Bay and community members of all ages.

The Thunder Bay Art Gallery opened on Feb 6, 1976 when funds were secured to construct a National Exhibition Centre on the campus of Confederation College. The Gallery was one of 26 newly established national exhibition centres opened in Canadian communities.

By 1982, the Thunder Bay National Exhibition Centre and Centre for Indian Art – as the Gallery was called then – had expanded into w three exhibition galleries, a collection storage area, and new capacity for exhibition and acquisition of art.

Today, the Thunder Bay Art Gallery has over 1600 works of art in its Permanent Collection. The Permanent Collection includes work by Norval Morrisseau, Carl Beam, Daphne Odjig, Robert Houle, Joane Cardinal-Schubert, Shelley Niro, Bob Boyer, Susan Ross, and Benjamin Chee Chee.

The Gallery provides school tours, hosts artistic events or shares our space with community groups.

A new 37,500 ft² Thunder Bay Art Gallery, designed by architects Patkau and Brook McIlroy with landscape architecture by Janet Rosenberg & Studio, is currently under construction on the city's waterfront, set to open in 2025.

References

External links

Art museums and galleries in Ontario
Museums in Thunder Bay
First Nations museums in Canada
Art museums established in 1976
1976 establishments in Ontario